Tangeretin is an O-polymethoxylated flavone that is found in tangerine and other citrus peels. Tangeretin strengthens the cell wall and acts as a plant's defensive mechanism against disease-causing pathogens.

It has also been used as a marker compound to detect contamination in citrus juices.

The following is a list of methods used to extract tangeretin from citrus peels: 
 column chromatography
 preparative-high performance liquid chromatography
 super critical fluid chromatography
 high speed counter current chromatography
 a combination of vacuum flash silica gel chromatography and flash C8 column chromatography
 flash chromatography 
 isolation using ionic liquids and a cycle of centrifugation and decantation
The low solubility of Tangeretin is one of the main reasons for the low bioavailability of Tangeretin (and other flavonoids in general), and has been reported as a major challenge when using the compound in laboratory procedures.
However, methods for tangeretin extraction are currently being tested to maximize efficiency and percent yields as its uses in treatment of cancer and other diseases are becoming better understood.

Tangeretin is commercially available as a dietary supplement. Tangeretin has also demonstrated beneficial applications in other pharmaceutical, nutraceutical, and cosmetic processes.

Tangeretin can be found as various synonyms throughout literature and research, including Tangeritin and 5,6,7,8,4’-pentamethoxyflavone (VIII)

References 

O-methylated flavones
Flavonoids found in Rutaceae